Bence Iszlai (born 29 May 1990) is a Hungarian football player.

Club statistics

Updated to games played as of 15 May 2021.

External links
 
 
 
 
 
 

1990 births
People from Veszprém
Living people
Hungarian footballers
Hungary youth international footballers
Hungary under-21 international footballers
Association football midfielders
Veszprém LC footballers
Szombathelyi Haladás footballers
Mezőkövesdi SE footballers
Diósgyőri VTK players
Nemzeti Bajnokság I players
Nemzeti Bajnokság II players
Sportspeople from Veszprém County